William Theodore Mulloy (November 9, 1892 – June 1, 1959) was an American prelate of the Roman Catholic Church. He served as Bishop of Covington from 1945 until his death in 1959.

Biography
The oldest of five children, William Mulloy was born in Ardoch, North Dakota, to William James and Margaret Ann (née Doyle) Mulloy. He attended St. Boniface College in Winnipeg, Canada, before returning to the United States and studying at St. Paul Seminary and St. Thomas College in St. Paul, Minnesota. He was ordained to the priesthood by Bishop James O'Reilly on June 7, 1916.

Returning to North Dakota, Mulloy then served as a curate at St. Michael Church in Grand Forks until 1920, when he became pastor of St. Boniface Church in Wimbledon. He was pastor of Sacred Heart Church in Cando from (1921-1925) and of St. Alphonsus Church in Langdon and dean of the Langdon Deanery (1925-1933). From 1933 to 1938, he served as pastor of his home parish of St. John the Evangelist Church in Grafton and dean of the Grafton Deanery. He became president of the National Catholic Rural Life Conference in 1935, and rector of St. Mary's Cathedral in 1938. He also served as superintendent of Catholic schools in the Diocese of Fargo and editor of the diocesan newspaper. He was raised to the rank of Domestic Prelate in 1941.

On November 18, 1944, Mulloy was appointed the sixth Bishop of Covington, Kentucky, by Pope Pius XII. He received his episcopal consecration on January 10, 1945 from Bishop Aloisius Joseph Muench, with Bishops Vincent James Ryan and Peter William Bartholome serving as co-consecrators, at St. Mary's Cathedral. In addition to rural issues, Mulloy was also dedicated to civil rights. Speaking to the Catholic Committee of the South in 1951, he declared that "racial justice is a moral question" and that Catholic leaders in the Southern United States "cannot remain silent," even at the expense of being labeled with "the opprobrious accusation of being 'anti-Southern.'"

After fifteen years as bishop, Mulloy died in Covington at age 66. He is buried at St. Mary Cemetery in Fort Mitchell.

References

1892 births
1959 deaths
People from Walsh County, North Dakota
20th-century Roman Catholic bishops in the United States
University of St. Thomas (Minnesota) alumni
Roman Catholic bishops of Covington
Roman Catholic Diocese of Fargo
Religious leaders from North Dakota
Catholics from Kentucky
Catholics from North Dakota